

Countess of Tripoli

House of Rouergue, 1102–1187

House of Poitiers, 1187–1289

Titular Countess of Tripoli

House of Lusignan

Notes

Sources 
 TRIPOLI

See also 
 List of Toulousain consorts
 Princess of Antioch

 
Tripoli